Glia, also called glial cells (gliocytes) or neuroglia, are non-neuronal cells in the central nervous system (brain and spinal cord) and the peripheral nervous system that do not produce electrical impulses. The neuroglia make up more than one half the volume of neural tissue in our body.  They maintain homeostasis, form myelin in the peripheral nervous system, and provide support and protection for neurons. In the central nervous system, glial cells include oligodendrocytes, astrocytes, ependymal cells, and microglia, and in the peripheral nervous system they include Schwann cells and satellite cells.

Function
They have four main functions:
to surround neurons and hold them in place
to supply nutrients and oxygen to neurons
to insulate one neuron from another
to destroy pathogens and remove dead neurons.
They also play a role in neurotransmission and synaptic connections, and in physiological processes such as breathing. While glia were thought to outnumber neurons by a ratio of 10:1, recent studies using newer methods and reappraisal of historical quantitative evidence suggests an overall ratio of less than 1:1, with substantial variation between different brain tissues.

Glial cells have far more cellular diversity and functions than neurons, and glial cells can respond to and manipulate neurotransmission in many ways. Additionally, they can affect both the preservation and consolidation of memories.

Glia were discovered in 1856, by the pathologist Rudolf Virchow in his search for a "connective tissue" in the brain. The term derives from Greek γλία and γλοία "glue" ( or ), and suggests the original impression that they were the glue of the nervous system.

Types

Macroglia
Derived from ectodermal tissue.

Microglia

Microglia are specialized macrophages capable of phagocytosis that protect neurons of the central nervous system. They are derived from the earliest wave of mononuclear cells that originate in yolk sac blood islands early in development, and colonize the brain shortly after the neural precursors begin to differentiate.

These cells are found in all regions of the brain and spinal cord. Microglial cells are small relative to macroglial cells, with changing shapes and oblong nuclei. They are mobile within the brain and multiply when the brain is damaged. In the healthy central nervous system, microglia processes constantly sample all aspects of their environment (neurons, macroglia and blood vessels). In a healthy brain, microglia direct the immune response to brain damage and play an important role in the inflammation that accompanies the damage. Many diseases and disorders are associated with deficient microglia, such as Alzheimer's disease, Parkinson's disease, and ALS.

Other
Pituicytes from the posterior pituitary are glial cells with characteristics in common to astrocytes. Tanycytes in the median eminence of the hypothalamus are a type of ependymal cell that descend from radial glia and line the base of the third ventricle. Drosophila melanogaster, the fruit fly, contains numerous glial types that are functionally similar to mammalian glia but are nonetheless classified differently.

Total number
In general, neuroglial cells are smaller than neurons. There are approximately 85 billion glia cells in the human brain, about the same number as neurons. Glial cells make up about half the total volume of the brain and spinal cord. The glia to neuron-ratio varies from one part of the brain to another. The glia to neuron-ratio in the cerebral cortex is 3.72 (60.84 billion glia (72%); 16.34 billion neurons), while that of the cerebellum is only 0.23 (16.04 billion glia; 69.03 billion neurons). The ratio in the cerebral cortex gray matter is 1.48, with 3.76 for the gray and white matter combined. The ratio of the basal ganglia, diencephalon and brainstem combined is 11.35.

The total number of glia cells in the human brain is distributed into the different types with oligodendrocytes being the most frequent (45–75%), followed by astrocytes (19–40%) and microglia (about 10% or less).

Development

Most glia are derived from ectodermal tissue of the developing embryo, in particular the neural tube and crest. The exception is microglia, which are derived from hemopoietic stem cells. In the adult, microglia are largely a self-renewing population and are distinct from macrophages and monocytes, which infiltrate an injured and diseased CNS.

In the central nervous system, glia develop from the ventricular zone of the neural tube. These glia include the oligodendrocytes, ependymal cells, and astrocytes. In the peripheral nervous system, glia derive from the neural crest. These PNS glia include Schwann cells in nerves and satellite glial cells in ganglia.

Capacity to divide
Glia retain the ability to undergo cell divisions in adulthood, whereas most neurons cannot. The view is based on the general inability of the mature nervous system to replace neurons after an injury, such as a stroke or trauma, where very often there is a substantial proliferation of glia, or gliosis, near or at the site of damage. However, detailed studies have found no evidence that 'mature' glia, such as astrocytes or oligodendrocytes, retain mitotic capacity. Only the resident oligodendrocyte precursor cells seem to keep this ability once the nervous system matures.

Glial cells are known to  be capable of mitosis. By contrast, scientific understanding of whether neurons are permanently post-mitotic, or capable of mitosis, is still developing. In the past, glia had been considered to lack certain features of neurons. For example, glial cells were not believed to have chemical synapses or to release transmitters. They were considered to be the passive bystanders of neural transmission. However, recent studies have shown this to not be entirely true.

Functions
Some glial cells function primarily as the physical support for neurons. Others provide nutrients to neurons and regulate the extracellular fluid of the brain, especially surrounding neurons and their synapses. During early embryogenesis, glial cells direct the migration of neurons and produce molecules that modify the growth of axons and dendrites. Some glial cells display regional diversity in the CNS and their functions may vary between the CNS regions.

Neuron repair and development
Glia are crucial in the development of the nervous system and in processes such as synaptic plasticity and synaptogenesis. Glia have a role in the regulation of repair of neurons after injury. In the central nervous system (CNS), glia suppress repair. Glial cells known as astrocytes enlarge and proliferate to form a scar and produce inhibitory molecules that inhibit regrowth of a damaged or severed axon. In the peripheral nervous system (PNS), glial cells known as Schwann cells (or also as neuri-lemmocytes) promote repair. After axonal injury, Schwann cells regress to an earlier developmental state to encourage regrowth of the axon. This difference between the CNS and the PNS, raises hopes for the regeneration of nervous tissue in the CNS. For example, a spinal cord may be able to be repaired following injury or severance.

Myelin sheath creation
Oligodendrocytes are found in the CNS and resemble an octopus: they have bulbous cell bodies with up to fifteen arm-like processes. Each process reaches out to an axon and spirals around it, creating a myelin sheath. The myelin sheath insulates the nerve fiber from the extracellular fluid and speeds up signal conduction along the nerve fiber. In the peripheral nervous system, Schwann cells are responsible for myelin production. These cells envelop nerve fibers of the PNS by winding repeatedly around them. This process creates a myelin sheath, which not only aids in conductivity but also assists in the regeneration of damaged fibers.

Neurotransmission
Astrocytes are crucial participants in the tripartite synapse. They have several crucial functions, including clearance of neurotransmitters from within the synaptic cleft, which aids in distinguishing between separate action potentials and prevents toxic build-up of certain neurotransmitters such as glutamate, which would otherwise lead to excitotoxicity. Furthermore, astrocytes release gliotransmitters such as glutamate, ATP, and D-serine in response to stimulation.

Clinical significance 

While glial cells in the PNS frequently assist in regeneration of lost neural functioning, loss of neurons in the CNS does not result in a similar reaction from neuroglia. In the CNS, regrowth will only happen if the trauma was mild, and not severe. When severe trauma presents itself, the survival of the remaining neurons becomes the optimal solution. However, some studies investigating the role of glial cells in Alzheimer's disease are beginning to contradict the usefulness of this feature, and even claim it can "exacerbate" the disease. In addition to affecting the potential repair of neurons in Alzheimer's disease, scarring and inflammation from glial cells have been further implicated in the degeneration of neurons caused by amyotrophic lateral sclerosis.

In addition to neurodegenerative diseases, a wide range of harmful exposure, such as hypoxia, or physical trauma, can lead to the end result of physical damage to the CNS. Generally, when damage occurs to the CNS, glial cells cause apoptosis among the surrounding cellular bodies. Then, there is a large amount of microglial activity, which results in inflammation, and finally, there is a heavy release of growth inhibiting molecules.

History
Although glial cells and neurons were probably first observed at the same time in the early 19th century, unlike neurons whose morphological and physiological properties were directly observable for the first investigators of the nervous system, glial cells had been considered to be merely “glue” that held neurons together until the mid-20th century.

Glia were first described in 1856 by the pathologist Rudolf Virchow in a comment to his 1846 publication on connective tissue. A more detailed description of glial cells was provided in the 1858 book 'Cellular Pathology' by the same author.

When markers for different types of cells were analyzed, Albert Einstein's brain was discovered to contain significantly more glia than normal brains in the left angular gyrus, an area thought to be responsible for mathematical processing and language. However, out of the total of 28 statistical comparisons between Einstein's brain and the control brains, finding one statistically significant result is not surprising and the claim that Einstein's brain is different, is not scientific (c.f. Multiple comparisons problem).

Not only does the ratio of glia to neurons increase through evolution, but so does the size of the glia. Astroglial cells in human brains have a volume 27 times greater than in mouse brains.

These important scientific findings may begin to shift the neurocentric perspective into a more holistic view of the brain which encompasses the glial cells as well. For the majority of the twentieth century, scientists had disregarded glial cells as mere physical scaffolds for neurons. Recent publications have proposed that the number of glial cells in the brain is correlated with the intelligence of a species.Moreover, evidences are demonstrating the active role of glia,in particular astroglia, in cognitive processes like learning and memory and, for these reasons, it has been proposed the foundation of a specific field to study these functions because investigations in this area are still limited due to the dominance of the neurocentric perspective.

See also 

 Polydendrocytes
List of human cell types derived from the germ layers

References

Bibliography
 
 Kettenmann and Ransom, Neuroglia, Oxford University Press, 2012,  |http://ukcatalogue.oup.com/product/9780199794591.do#.UVcswaD3Ay4|

Further reading 

 Role of glia in synapse development 

 Artist ADSkyler (uses concepts of neuroscience and found inspiration from Glia)

External links 

 "The Other Brain"—The Leonard Lopate Show (WNYC) "Neuroscientist Douglas Field, explains how glia, which make up approximately 85 percent of the cells in the brain, work. In The Other Brain: From Dementia to Schizophrenia, How New Discoveries about the Brain Are Revolutionizing Medicine and Science, he explains recent discoveries in glia research and looks at what breakthroughs in brain science and medicine are likely to come."
"Network Glia" A homepage devoted to glial cells.

Glial cells